Powder Mountain, is a volcanic summit in the Powder Mountain Icefield in the Pacific Ranges of the Coast Mountains in southwestern British Columbia, Canada.

Much of the volcanic history of Powder Mountain remains hidden apart from a few scraps of volcanic rock extending from under its current ice cap.

See also
 List of volcanoes in Canada
 Volcanism of Canada
 Volcanism of Western Canada
 Brandywine Mountain
 Mount Fee
 Callaghan Valley

References

Two-thousanders of British Columbia
Volcanoes of British Columbia
Lava domes
Pacific Ranges
Sea-to-Sky Corridor
New Westminster Land District